Nokia 206 is an entry level dual-SIM mobile phone from Nokia. It was announced alongside the Nokia Asha 205 in November 2012 and was first released in January 2013. It is the successor to the Nokia Asha 200 and the Nokia Asha 201. However, the 206 is not an Asha device.

Appearance 
The colors introduced to this phone are very vivid and are very similar to the ongoing trend to Nokia's Lumia series. The selected colors are cyan, magenta, yellow, black and white. The device has 'uni colored' body rather than combination. The 206's back design is similar to the Nokia Lumia 920, but the difference is that the Nokia 206s is made by plastic, Lumia 920s is made by zirconium boride .

Camera 
The device is able to capture pictures at resolution of 1280 x 960 pixels with a 1.3-megapixel camera. Camera features include Landscape orientation, Auto and Manual White Balance settings, Active toolbar, Still image Editor, Full screen viewfinder, Self-timer. Supported video playback frame rate is 15 fps. In addition to that White balance video modes are: Fluorescent, Incandescent, Automatic and Daylight for video recording.

Nokia 206 is embedded with Nokia's Xpress browser.

Connectivity 
Along with support of EDGE technology, Nokia has taken Bluetooth connectivity to a new level called Nokia Slam which has put aside the complications of device pairing aside and just require a touch to another Bluetooth supported device to transfer content. Bluetooth v2.1, Supported Profiles (SPP 1.0, DUN, FTP, GOEP, EDR, HFP, OPP, GAP, PBAP 1.0, SAP, SDAP, HSP).

Software 
Nokia 206 runs on Nokia's S40 UI. The phone comes pre-loaded with several apps and games, including Bejeweled, Need for Speed: Shift, Asphalt 6: Adrenaline and Midnight Pool 3, along with social apps including WhatsApp and Facebook.  The pre-loaded apps vary by region/market. You can download more apps from the Ovi Store.

References

External links 
Device Overview: http://www.nokia.com/global/products/phone/206/
Detailed Information: http://www.nokia.com/global/products/phone/206-dual-sim/specifications/#sales-package
Specs: http://www.phonearena.com/news/Nokia-206-announced-pays-homage-to-Nokia-6300_id36999
Specs: http://gadgets.ndtv.com/mobiles/news/nokia-announces-asha-205-asha-206-mobile-phones-with-dual-sim-options-297435
Specs & Comparison: http://bigphonefight.com/nokia-109-vs-nokia-206-review

206
Mobile phones with user-replaceable battery
Mobile phones introduced in 2012